Michael Mansfield (born 8 August 1971) is a former Australian rules footballer who played for the Geelong Football Club and the Carlton Football Club in the Australian Football League (AFL).

A left footed half back flanker, Mansfield was recruited from St Joseph's and debuted for Geelong in 1990. He played 181 games for the Cats before moving to Carlton in 1999 where he brought up his 200th game of AFL. During his time with Geelong, Mansfield was twice named an All-Australian, in 1994 and 1995. Mansfield is now a stockbroker in Melbourne.

Statistics

|-
|- style="background-color: #EAEAEA"
! scope="row" style="text-align:center" | 1990
|style="text-align:center;"|
| 49 || 5 || 2 || 2 || 69 || 33 || 102 || 19 || 4 || 0.4 || 0.4 || 13.8 || 6.6 || 20.4 || 3.8 || 0.8 || 3
|-
! scope="row" style="text-align:center" | 1991
|style="text-align:center;"|
| 21 || 16 || 24 || 15 || 158 || 94 || 252 || 62 || 11 || 1.5 || 0.9 || 9.9 || 5.9 || 15.8 || 3.9 || 0.7 || 0
|- style="background-color: #EAEAEA"
! scope="row" style="text-align:center" | 1992
|style="text-align:center;"|
| 21 || 19 || 9 || 5 || 197 || 102 || 299 || 77 || 22 || 0.5 || 0.3 || 10.4 || 5.4 || 15.7 || 4.1 || 1.2 || 3
|-
! scope="row" style="text-align:center" | 1993
|style="text-align:center;"|
| 21 || 9 || 4 || 6 || 69 || 32 || 101 || 22 || 12 || 0.4 || 0.7 || 7.7 || 3.6 || 11.2 || 2.4 || 1.3 || 0
|- style="background-color: #EAEAEA"
! scope="row" style="text-align:center" | 1994
|style="text-align:center;"|
| 21 || 25 || 3 || 3 || 244 || 151 || 395 || 129 || 40 || 0.1 || 0.1 || 9.8 || 6.0 || 15.8 || 5.2 || 1.6 || 11
|-
! scope="row" style="text-align:center" | 1995
|style="text-align:center;"|
| 21 || 23 || 5 || 3 || 221 || 138 || 359 || 103 || 29 || 0.2 || 0.1 || 9.6 || 6.0 || 15.6 || 4.5 || 1.3 || 3
|- style="background-color: #EAEAEA"
! scope="row" style="text-align:center" | 1996
|style="text-align:center;"|
| 21 || 21 || 20 || 13 || 195 || 137 || 332 || 106 || 25 || 1.0 || 0.6 || 9.3 || 6.5 || 15.8 || 5.0 || 1.2 || 2
|-
! scope="row" style="text-align:center" | 1997
|style="text-align:center;"|
| 21 || 23 || 14 || 9 || 189 || 139 || 328 || 116 || 22 || 0.6 || 0.4 || 8.2 || 6.0 || 14.3 || 5.0 || 1.0 || 5
|- style="background-color: #EAEAEA"
! scope="row" style="text-align:center" | 1998
|style="text-align:center;"|
| 21 || 22 || 5 || 13 || 208 || 119 || 327 || 119 || 24 || 0.2 || 0.6 || 9.5 || 5.4 || 14.9 || 5.4 || 1.1 || 1
|-
! scope="row" style="text-align:center" | 1999
|style="text-align:center;"|
| 21 || 18 || 14 || 8 || 142 || 74 || 216 || 77 || 15 || 0.8 || 0.4 || 7.9 || 4.1 || 12.0 || 4.3 || 0.8 || 0
|- style="background-color: #EAEAEA"
! scope="row" style="text-align:center" | 2000
|style="text-align:center;"|
| 10 || 18 || 6 || 2 || 116 || 72 || 188 || 46 || 31 || 0.3 || 0.1 || 6.4 || 4.0 || 10.4 || 2.6 || 1.7 || 0
|-
! scope="row" style="text-align:center" | 2001
|style="text-align:center;"|
| 10 || 20 || 7 || 10 || 155 || 89 || 244 || 71 || 29 || 0.4 || 0.5 || 7.8 || 4.5 || 12.2 || 3.5 || 1.5 || 0
|- style="background-color: #EAEAEA"
! scope="row" style="text-align:center" | 2002
|style="text-align:center;"|
| 10 || 16 || 5 || 4 || 79 || 49 || 128 || 45 || 19 || 0.3 || 0.3 || 4.9 || 3.1 || 8.0 || 2.8 || 1.2 || 0
|- class="sortbottom"
! colspan=3| Career
! 235
! 118
! 93
! 2042
! 1229
! 3271
! 992
! 283
! 0.5
! 0.4
! 8.7
! 5.2
! 13.9
! 4.2
! 1.2
! 28
|}

References

External links
 

1971 births
Living people
Australian rules footballers from Victoria (Australia)
Geelong Football Club players
Carlton Football Club players
Tasmanian State of Origin players
All-Australians (AFL)
St Joseph's Football Club players
Victorian State of Origin players